Jane Corcoran (August 13, 1881 – August 27, 1961) was an American stage actress.

Early life 

Jane Eleanor Corcoran was born in San Francisco, the daughter of actress Estha (or Esta) Williams and Joseph T. Corcoran, and stepdaughter of director Arthur Clifford Aiston, who was also her manager. She began acting as a child. She attended the Institute of Holy Angels in Fort Lee, New Jersey, for her schooling.

Career 
Broadway appearances by Corcoran included roles in A Stranger in a Strange Land (1899), All for a Girl (1908), Mother (1910), A Rich Man's Son (1912), Life (1914), Drifting (1922), The World We Live In (1922), Kitty's Kisses (1926), Street Scene (1929), Little Orchid Annie (1930), Little Women (1931), A Night of Barrie (1932), A Saturday Night (1933), A Party (1933), and While Parents Sleep (1934). Other stage credits, often in touring productions, included roles in Tennessee's Pardner, Mlle Fifi, At the Old Cross Roads, Pretty Peggy, The Freedom of Suzanne, The Man of the Hour, Divorçons, A Doll's House, and A Gentleman from Mississippi.

Corcoran appeared in a short silent film, Mother (1914), adapted from the Broadway show. She also had uncredited small parts in two later films, Fritz Lang's Fury (1936) and John Cromwell's Abe Lincoln in Illinois (1940).

Personal life 
Corcoran married Brooklyn businessman and theatrical producer J. Emmett Baxter in 1902. She was widowed when Baxter died in 1920. She lived with her mother and a nurse in Los Angeles in 1940.  She died in Philadelphia at the Greystone Nursing Home on Aug 27, 1961, aged 80 years. She was buried at Westminster Cemetery.

References

External links 

 

1881 births
1961 deaths
Actresses from San Francisco